The Rt Rev Kenneth Edward Norman Lamplugh (9 November 1901 – 2 October 1979) was the eighth Suffragan Bishop of Southampton.

He was educated at  King's College, Cambridge. Ordained in 1926 he began his career with  curacies at Lambeth and Pietermaritzburg. He was then Vicar of St Mary's, Durban and after that Hartley Wintney. From 1942 he was Rural Dean of Lyndhurst and then (his final appointment before elevation to the Episcopate) Archdeacon of Lincoln.  He died on 2 October 1979.

Notes

1901 births
Alumni of King's College, Cambridge
Archdeacons of Lincoln
Bishops of Southampton
20th-century Church of England bishops
1979 deaths